Mongolia competed in the 2008 Summer Olympics, held in Beijing, China, from August 8 to August 24, 2008. 29 athletes represented the country and competed in seven events. The Beijing Olympics has been Mongolia's most successful games ever, winning two gold and two silver medals, exceeding the 1980 Moscow Olympics where the nation won two silver and two bronze medals.

Medalists
Judoka Naidangiin Tüvshinbayar became the first Mongolian ever to win an Olympic gold medal.  Otryadin Gündegmaa won Mongolia's first silver since the 1980 Moscow Games.  Pürevdorjiin Serdamba won Mongolia's first silver medal in boxing. He was followed by Enkhbatyn Badar-Uugan, who won Mongolia's first gold medal in boxing, and second gold medal overall.

Athletics

Men

Women

Boxing

Mongolia qualified four boxers for the Olympic boxing tournament. Badar-Uugan was the first to qualify, doing so at the 2007 World Championships. All three of the others qualified at the second Asian continental qualifying tournament.

Judo

Mongolia received 10 qualifications for Judo at the Asian Championships, and qualified them by test matches.

Men

Women

Shooting

Women

Swimming

Mongolia selected two athletes by granting wild card entries.

Men

Women

Weightlifting

Wrestling

Men's freestyle

Women's freestyle

See also
Mongolia at the Olympics

References

External links
Olympic.mn Mongolian National Olympic Committee 
Olympic.mn Mongolian Olympic Team 
Olympic.mn Olympic Timetable for Mongolian athletes 

Nations at the 2008 Summer Olympics
2008
Summer Olympics